Nina Kamenik (born 27 April 1985) is a German ice hockey player for the Eisbären Juniors Berlin and the German national team.

She participated at the 2015 IIHF Women's World Championship.

International career
Kamenik was selected for the Germany women's national ice hockey team at the 2014 Winter Olympics. She had one assist in five games.

Kamenik also played for Germany in the qualifying event for the 2014 Winter Olympics and the 2010 Olympics.

As of 2014, Kamenik has also appeared for Germany at five IIHF Women's World Championships. Her first appearance came in 2008.

Career statistics
Through 2013–14 season

References

External links

1985 births
Living people
Ice hockey people from Berlin
Ice hockey players at the 2014 Winter Olympics
Olympic ice hockey players of Germany
German women's ice hockey forwards